The Logan County Courthouse in Napoleon, North Dakota was built in 1921 and extended in 1924. It was listed on the National Register of Historic Places in 1985.

References

Courthouses on the National Register of Historic Places in North Dakota
County courthouses in North Dakota
Government buildings completed in 1921
National Register of Historic Places in Logan County, North Dakota
Federal architecture in North Dakota
1921 establishments in North Dakota